The China Geological Survey (CGS)  is a government-owned, not-for-profit, Chinese organization researching China's mineral resources. It is a public institution managed by the State Council's ministries and commissions responsible for geological and mineral exploration under the State Council of the People's Republic of China. According to the national land and resources survey plan, it is now managed by the Ministry of Natural Resources. It is the largest Geoscience agency in China since being reinstated in 1999.

History

The China Geological Survey originated in the early days of the Republic of China (when it had control over mainland China).  Many prominent geologists and paleontologists worked with the Survey in the early days, such as Davidson Black or Teilhard de Chardin. It was disbanded after the People's Republic of China gained control over mainland China and reinstated in 1999.

Republic of China period

The China Geological Survey originated in the period of the Republic of China. In 1912, the Nanjing Provisional Government of the Republic of China officially established the Geological Section in the Mining Department of the Ministry of Industry. In June 1913, the Government of the Republic of China established the "Geological Survey Institute of the Ministry of Industry and Commerce". In February 1916, the Ministry of Agriculture and Commerce of the Beiyang Government established a Geological Survey Bureau directly under it. In July 1916, the first batch of 18 geological graduates independently trained by China officially entered the Geological Survey Bureau of the Ministry of Agriculture and Commerce. In October 1916, the Geological Survey Bureau was renamed the Geological Survey Institute and implemented independent accounting. Many famous geologists and paleontologists of the time, such as Davidson Black, carried out the survey work in the early stage. And Zhang Hongzhao, Ding Wenjiang, Weng Wenhao, Li Siguang and other 299 geologists.

During the Anti-Japanese War, the Geological Survey Institute first moved from Beiping to Nanjing, and then from Nanjing to Chongqing via Changsha. During this period, Yanchang Oilfield and Yumen Oilfield were successively discovered or surveyed, a batch of tungsten mines were discovered in Jiangxi, bauxite mines were discovered in Yunnan and Guizhou, and coal mines were discovered in Zhaotong, Yunnan and Shuicheng, Guizhou.

Early Period of People's Republic of China 

After the founding of People's Republic of China in 1949, before and after the start of the "First Five-Year Plan", the country's economic construction urgently needed mineral support. Li Siguang led the planning and established the China Geological Work Planning Steering Committee in August 1950. In 1952, the Ministry of Geology was established to lead and manage the general survey and exploration of mineral resources in the country, and to uniformly arrange and organize the implementation of national geological work. Li Siguang was appointed as the Minister of Geology. In 1952, domestic colleges and universities adjusted the setting of geology majors and established professional geology colleges with complete disciplines. By 1966, in addition to the affiliated Beijing Institute of Geology, Chengdu Institute of Geology, and Changchun Institute of Geology, more than 20 colleges and universities across the country had departments of geology, coalfield geology, and marine geology. In the more than ten years from 1953 to 1966, the geological department trained 75,000 geological graduates at all levels, more than 100 times the number of geological professionals trained before 1949. In addition to the geological talents trained by other departments, The total number exceeds 110,000. Among them, graduate students accounted for 0.75% of the total, and undergraduate students accounted for 38.8%. In 1970, the State Council reformed and the Ministry of Geology was reorganized into the Geological Bureau of the State Planning Commission.

After the reform and opening up 

After the reform and opening up, the Ministry of Geology was restored. In 1982, the Ministry of Geology was renamed the Ministry of Geology and Mineral Resources. From 1977 to 1996, a total of 300,000 geological graduates were trained. The Ministry of Land and Resources was established in 1998. In 1999, the reform of the geological survey system was implemented, and the China Geological Survey Bureau was established. As of October 2016, there were 7,549 active employees. Among them, there are 1,423 people with a doctoral degree and 2,392 people with a master's degree, accounting for 19% and 32% of the total number respectively; 1,185 people have senior professional titles, and 1,464 people with associate senior professional titles, accounting for 16% and 19% of the total number respectively. There are 16 academicians of the Chinese Academy of Sciences and the Chinese Academy of Engineering, 9 of them won the title of "Li Siguang Scholar", 33 of outstanding geological talents, and 58 of outstanding geological talents.

Responsibility 
According to the "Main Responsibilities, Internal Organizations and Staffing Regulations of the China Geological Survey", the China Geological Survey undertakes the following responsibilities:

1. Unified deployment and organization of national basic and public welfare geological surveys and prospect evaluation of mineral resources; organization and implementation of national strategic mineral exploration work and geological survey work in the early stage of some major construction projects assigned by the state.

2. Organize the implementation of hydrogeological, engineering geological and environmental geological survey and evaluation work, carry out geological environmental monitoring and geological disaster investigation, forecast and early warning and special prevention and control.

3. Carry out cutting-edge and basic geological research, as well as applied research related to geological survey and mineral exploration; carry out research, introduction and promotion of new technologies, new methods, and new techniques for geological survey and mineral exploration.

4. Entrusted by the Ministry of Natural Resources, organize the formulation of technical regulations, norms and standards for geological survey and mineral exploration; organize the implementation of quality supervision and supervision of major projects.

5. Establish a geological survey and mineral exploration information network system, and carry out social welfare services such as geological data information and national land archives.

6. Carry out international exchanges and cooperation related to geological surveys and mineral exploration, as well as preliminary geological work on the use of foreign mineral resources.

7. Unified management of the national public welfare geological survey team. Implement project contact and business guidance for the national geological survey work undertaken by the local non-profit geological survey team. Carry out supervision and inspection of project implementation and result management.

8. Undertake other tasks assigned by the Ministry of Natural Resources.

Institutional settings 
According to the "Regulations on Main Responsibilities, Internal Organizations and Staffing of China Geological Survey", China Geological Survey has established the following institutions:

Internal organization

 Finance Department
 Chief Engineer Office
 Basic Investigation Department
 Resource Evaluation Department
 Department of Hydrogeology and Environmental Geology
 Ministry of Science and Technology Foreign Affairs
 Equipment Department
 Personnel and Education Department
 Supervision and Audit Office
 Directly affiliated party committee

Nine Programs 
There are nine big programs now holding on the China Geology Website Released. 

 Program of Geological Survey for Terrestrial Energy Mineral Resources.
 Program of Important Mineral Resources Investigation.
 Program of Comprehensive Geological Survey of Important Economic Zones and Urban Clusters.
 Program of Geo-disaster Prevention and Geoenvironment Protection.
 Program of Basic Geological Survey for Land Development and Protection.
 Program of Geological Survey and Information Service for One Belt and One Road.
 Program of Geoscientific Research and Advanced Technology Support.
 Program of Update and Application of Geodata.
 Program of Marine Geological Survey.

See also

 Cenozoic Research Laboratory
 Geology of China
 Geological Museum of China
 History of Chinese archaeology
 China University of Geosciences
 List of geoscience organizations
 Land and resources competent authority: Ministry of Natural Resources of the People's Republic of China
 Professional fields Universities directly under the Ministry of Education: China University of Geosciences
 Meteorological forecasting departments: China Meteorological Administration
 Earthquake monitoring department: China Earthquake Administration
 Surveying and Mapping Department: National Bureau of Surveying

References

External links 
Official site

Earth sciences organizations
National geological agencies
Scientific organizations based in China
Science and technology in the People's Republic of China
Geological surveys
Geology of China